Rafieya Aasieya "Zara" Husain (born 24 May 1992) is an Indian-Guyanese beauty pageant titleholder who was crowned Miss World Guyana 2014 and represented Guyana at Miss World 2014 in London and placed Top 11. she also was crowned Miss Universe Guyana 2017 and also represented Guyana at Miss Universe 2017 pageant.

Controversy over her selection led to Guyana being barred from the 2018 pageant.

References

Living people
1992 births
Female models from Mumbai
Miss Universe 2017 contestants
Miss World 2014 delegates